Forkhead box Q1 is a protein that in humans is encoded by the FOXQ1 gene.

Function

FOXQ1 is a member of the FOX gene family, which is characterized by a conserved 110-amino acid DNA-binding motif called the forkhead or winged helix domain. FOX genes are involved in embryonic development, cell cycle regulation, tissue-specific gene expression, cell signaling, and tumorigenesis (Bieller et al., 2001 [PubMed 11747606]).

References

Further reading 

Genes
Forkhead transcription factors